Solomon David Bellear  (1950/1951 – 29 November 2017) was an Aboriginal Australian public figure.

Early life
Bellear was brought up in the far north of New South Wales and was one of nine children. His brother Bob became a judge.

Activism
In 1970 Bellear was part of a delegation that intended to speak to the United Nations General Assembly on Aboriginal and Torres Strait Islander issues. The trip involved attending the "Congress of the African People" in Atlanta, Georgia, United States.

Bellear was the first chair of the Aboriginal Legal Service when it was founded in the early 1970s.

He was the chairman of the Aboriginal Medical Service in Redfern, New South Wales and was on the board from 1975 until his death.

In 1990 Bellear became a member of the Aboriginal and Torres Strait Islander Commission (ATSIC), becoming elected as one of 20 councillors for the Sydney region. He was subsequently elected a commissioner for the NSW Metropolitan Zone.  He served as deputy chair before stepping down in 1994.

Rugby league
During the late 1970s he was graded by the South Sydney Rabbitohs. He was also involved in the Redfern All Blacks, that played at the Koori Knockout competition.

Bellear was a director of South Sydney from 2002 until resigning over the takeover of Russell Crowe and Peter Holmes a Court in 2006.

Bellear was team manager of the Indigenous Dreamtime team who played a Māori team in an exhibition match that preceded the 2008 Rugby League World Cup.

Honours
In 1999 Bellear became a Member of the Order of Australia (AM) for services to the Aboriginal community. The citation mentions his work in Aboriginal health.

References

External links 
Tribute and state funeral coverage
 Judge Bob Bellear & brother Sol, photo taken at the 30th anniversary dinner of the Aboriginal Medical Service (2001) 

1950s births
2017 deaths
Members of the Order of Australia
Bundjalung people